Deportation of Armenians may refer to:

 The deportation of Armenians from Iranian Armenia and their settlement in New Julfa in the early 17th century
 Deportation of Armenian intellectuals on 24 April 1915
 Armenian genocide, from 1915 to 1918
 The deportation of Armenians from Azerbaijan from 1988 to 1994 as part of the Nagorno-Karabakh conflict